The Stairs (later renamed as The Steps of Age ) is a 1950 American short documentary film. It focuses on a woman in her sixties who retires and goes to live with her daughter.

It was nominated for an Academy Award for Best Documentary Short.

References

External links

The Steps of Age at the National Film Preservation Foundation
The Steps of Age at the United States National Library of Medicine

1950 films
1950s short documentary films
American black-and-white films
American short documentary films
Black-and-white documentary films
1950s English-language films
1950s American films